Theodore I served as Greek Patriarch of Alexandria between 607 and 609. Having been appointed by Phocas, he opposed the Heraclian revolt and was killed in the conflict.

References

7th-century Patriarchs of Alexandria